Strange Inheritance or The Traveller on All Saints' Day (French: Le voyageur de la Toussaint, Italian: Il viaggiatore d'Ognissanti) is a 1943 French-Italian mystery film directed by Louis Daquin and starring Assia Noris, Jules Berry, Gabrielle Dorziat and Guillaume de Sax. It is an adaptation of the 1941 novel of the same title by Georges Simenon.

The film's sets were designed by the art director René Moulaert. It was made as a co-production between Occupied France and Fascist Italy.

Synopsis
On a misty November day a young man makes a returns to his hometown of La Rochelle following the death of his Uncle, who has left him his entire fortune. He finds his upper-class family resent him because his parents were both music hall entertainers. He begins to investigate the circumstances of his uncle's suspicious death.

Cast
 Assia Noris as Colette Mauvoisin
 Jules Berry as Plantel
 Gabrielle Dorziat as Gérardine Éloi
 Guillaume de Sax as Babin
 Jean Desailly as Gilles Mauvoisin
 Simone Valère as Alice Lepart
 Serge Reggiani as Bob Éloi
 Hubert Prélier as Le docteur Sauvaget
 Jacques Castelot as Jean Plantel
 Jean Didier as Le marin
 Martial Rèbe as Lepart
 Eugène Yvernès as Le capitaine du navire 
 Mona Dol as Jaja
 Marguerite Ducouret as Madame Rinquet
 Marie-Hélène Dasté as Madame Sauvaget
 Christiane Ribes as Armandine
 Ginette Curtey as 	Raymonde
 Alexandre Rignault as L'inspecteur Rinquet
 Louis Seigner as Maître Hervineau 
 Roger Karl as 	Pénoux-Rataud
 Guy Decomble as Robert
 René Blancard as Le directeur du théâtre 
 Jean Daurand as Un marin 
 Clary Monthal	as	Madame Lepart 
 Albert Rémy as L'ivrogne 
 Marcel Duhamel as Le juge d'instruction
 Gabrielle Fontan as 	La vieille aubergiste 
 Léon Larive as Le patron du restaurant 
 Marguerite de Morlaye as Une invitée du banquet
 Simone Signoret as Extra

References

Bibliography
 Carter, David. The Pocket Essential Georges Simenon. Pocket Essentials, 2003.
 Chiti, Roberto & Poppi, Roberto. I film: Tutti i film italiani dal 1930 al 1944. Gremese Editore, 2005.
 Moliterno, Gino. Historical Dictionary of Italian Cinema. Scarecrow Press, 2008.

External links

1943 films
1943 mystery films
1940s French-language films
Films based on Belgian novels
Films based on works by Georges Simenon
Films directed by Louis Daquin
Films with screenplays by Marcel Aymé
French black-and-white films
French mystery films
Italian mystery films
Films set in La Rochelle
1940s French films
1940s Italian films